The Munster Junior Club Football Championship, formally known for sponsorship reasons as the AIB Munster GAA Junior Club Football Championship, is a Gaelic football competition, organized by the Munster provincial council of the Gaelic Athletic Association. The competition is played between the winners of the Junior Football championships in the 6 counties of Munster. It was first played officially in 2003 when Annascaul from Kerry and Carbery Rangers from Cork played each other. The winners of this competition will play against the winners of the other three provincial champions and the winner of the Britain championship for the All-Ireland Junior Club Football Championship.

Qualification

List of finals

See also
 Leinster Junior Club Football Championship
 Connacht Junior Club Football Championship
 Ulster Junior Club Football Championship

References

External links
 Details of finals & teams from Munster GAA website

Junior